Kabansk (Buryat and , Khabaan) is a rural locality (a selo) and the administrative center of Kabansky District of the Republic of Buryatia, Russia. Population:

References

Notes

Sources

Rural localities in Kabansky District